Results from Norwegian football in 2001.

Men's football

League season

Tippeligaen

Play-off
November 7: Bryne – Hamarkameratene 3–0
 Bryne stadion
 Att: 4030
 1–0 (25) Marcus Andreasson 
 2–0 (84) Trond Bjørnsen 
 3–0 (86) Trond Bjørnsen 
 Yellow card: Stian Thomassen, Hamarkameratene.

November 10: Hamarkameratene – Bryne 0–0 (agg. 0–3)
 Briskeby Gressbane
 Att: 2552
 Yellow card: Marcus Andreasson, Geir Atle Undheim, Anders Friberg,
 Bryne.

Bryne stayed up.

1. divisjon

Second Division

Group 1
 1. Tollnes 26 14 8 4 73- 47 50 Promoted
 -------------------------------------
 2. FF Lillehammer 26 15 5 6 44- 31 50
 3. Eik-Tønsberg 26 15 4 7 63- 44 49
 4. Fredrikstad 26 15 2 9 52- 42 47
 5. Bærum 26 12 5 9 60- 44 41
 6. Nybergsund 26 12 3 11 43- 37 39
 7. Ullensaker/Kisa 26 10 6 10 58- 58 36
 8. Pors Grenland 26 11 3 12 46- 52 36
 9. Kvik Halden 26 11 1 14 41- 38 34
 10.Sprint/Jeløy 26 10 4 12 42- 54 34
 11.Stabæk 2 26 10 3 13 46- 43 33
 -------------------------------------
 12.Asker 26 8 5 13 42- 56 29 Relegated
 13.Ullern 26 5 5 16 36- 68 20 Relegated
 14.Odd Grenland 2 26 5 4 17 47- 79 19 Relegated

Group 2
 1. Åsane 26 19 4 3 57- 17 61 Promoted
 -------------------------------------
 2. Fana 26 17 4 5 66- 36 55
 3. Vard Haugesund 26 16 4 6 71- 40 52
 4. Fyllingen 26 14 6 6 63- 48 48
 5. Løv-Ham 26 14 1 11 59- 36 43
 6. Nord 26 13 2 11 54- 50 41
 7. Viking 2 26 11 4 11 71- 65 37
 8. Vidar 26 11 3 12 60- 62 36
 9. Førde 26 9 6 11 60- 70 33
 10.Tornado 26 9 5 12 56- 63 32
 11.Nest-Sotra 26 9 4 13 49- 51 31
 -------------------------------------
 12.Sandnes 26 9 4 13 47- 56 31 Relegated
 13.Florø 26 4 5 17 32- 69 17 Relegated
 14.Stord 26 1 0 25 31- 113 3 Relegated

Group 3
 1. Oslo Øst 26 18 4 4 74- 36 58 Promoted
 -------------------------------------
 2. Strindheim 26 15 5 6 70- 45 50
 3. Rosenborg 2 26 15 4 7 58- 37 49
 4. Romerike 26 14 5 7 66- 34 47
 5. Træff 26 11 5 10 55- 50 38
 6. Skarbøvik 26 10 6 10 47- 58 36
 7. Steinkjer 26 10 5 11 44- 48 35
 8. Clausenengen 26 10 5 11 55- 63 35
 9. Molde 2 26 9 6 11 60- 50 33
 10.Spjelkavik 26 8 6 12 49- 66 30
 11.Verdal 26 8 5 13 42- 51 29
 -------------------------------------
 12.Gjøvik/Lyn 26 7 6 13 34- 48 27 Relegated
 13.Stjørdals/Blink 26 9 0 17 37- 74 27 Relegated
 14.Ranheim 26 6 2 18 37- 68 20 Relegated

Group 4
 1. Lørenskog 26 18 5 3 69- 23 59 Promoted
 -------------------------------------
 2. Skarp 26 17 2 7 85- 45 53
 3. Lofoten 26 15 6 5 65- 43 51
 4. Lyn 2 26 13 4 9 57- 41 43
 5. Alta 26 13 1 12 60- 57 40
 6. Stålkameratene 26 11 5 10 60- 67 38
 7. Harstad 26 10 5 11 58- 49 35
 8. Skjervøy 26 8 10 8 50- 50 34
 9. Eidsvold Turn 26 10 3 13 52- 53 33
 10.Mo 26 9 6 11 55- 61 33
 11. Hammerfest 26 8 4 14 44- 58 28
 -------------------------------------
 12.Fauske/Sprint 26 8 2 16 46- 79 26 Relegated
 13.Narvik 26 6 6 14 43- 58 24 Relegated
 14.Finnsnes 26 5 3 18 32- 92 18 Relegated

Third Division

Group 1
 1. Lillestrøm 2 20 17 2 1 99–17 53 Play-off
 – - – - – - – - – - – - – - – - – - – -
 2. Grorud 20 14 2 4 52–28 44
 3. Vålerenga 2 20 12 2 6 59–40 38
 4. Lisleby 20 10 3 7 37–38 33
 5. Råde 20 9 2 9 42–37 29
 6. Rygge 20 7 4 9 40–44 25
 7. Rælingen 20 7 2 11 34–53 23
 8. Rolvsøy 20 6 3 11 28–57 21
 9. Volla 20 5 3 12 34–50 18 (1
 ---------------------------------------
 10.Vestli 20 5 2 13 28–59 17 Relegated
 11.Oppsal 20 4 3 13 28–58 15 Relegated
 Tune withdrew

(1: Volla changed their name to Focus

Group 2
 1. Follo 22 18 1 3 79–22 55 Play-off
 – - – - – - – - – - – - – - – - – - – -
 2. Østsiden 22 16 2 4 60–22 50
 3. Årvoll 22 15 3 4 77–40 48
 4. KFUM Oslo 22 13 6 3 48–19 45
 5. Navestad 22 12 2 8 47–33 38 (1
 6. Fredrikstad 2 22 8 3 11 44–51 27
 7. Oslo Øst 2 22 7 4 11 37–48 25
 8. Borgen 22 6 6 10 46–52 24
 9. Torp 22 7 3 12 41–60 24
 ---------------------------------------
 10.Bjerke 22 5 3 14 36–61 18 Relegated
 11.Leirsund 22 5 3 14 38–79 18 Relegated
 12.Lommedalen 22 1 2 19 35–101 5 Relegated

(1: Navestad changed their name to Borg Fotball (superstructure).

Group 3
 1. Kongsvinger 2 22 13 3 6 63–28 42
 – - – - – - – - – - – - – - – - – - – -
 2. Nittedal 22 13 3 6 67–42 42 Play-off
 3. Brumunddal 22 12 6 4 53–29 42 
 4. Romerike 2 22 12 4 6 60–43 40
 5. Grue 22 12 3 7 62–39 39 
 6. Ringsaker 22 8 8 6 38–33 32
 7. Høland 22 9 3 10 56–57 30
 8. Aurskog/Finstadbru 22 7 7 8 44–37 28
 9. Sørumsand 22 8 3 11 44–57 27
 ---------------------------------------
 10.Eidskog 22 7 4 11 36–56 25 Relegated
 11.Kjellmyra 22 4 2 16 21–59 14 Relegated
 12.Flisa 22 3 2 17 27–91 11 Relegated

Group 4
 1. Moss 2 22 17 5 0 72–28 56 Play-off
 – - – - – - – - – - – - – - – - – - – -
 2. Sparta 22 11 4 7 49–28 37
 3. Strømmen 22 10 5 7 46–37 35 
 4. Nordstrand 22 11 2 9 45–37 35
 5. Haugerud 22 10 5 7 47–42 35 (1
 6. Skeid 2 22 9 4 9 53–50 31
 7. Selbak 22 8 5 9 43–43 29
 8. Drøbak/Frogn 22 8 5 9 37–42 29
 9. Fjellhamar 22 7 5 10 42–44 26
 ---------------------------------------
 10.Bækkelaget 22 4 10 8 31–44 22 Relegated
 12. Tistedalen 22 3 8 11 26–52 17 Relegated
 13.Korsvoll 22 2 6 14 23–67 12 Relegated

(1: Haugerud merged with Tveita and Trosterud to form Hellerud.

Group 5
 1. Frigg Oslo 22 14 5 3 57–29 47 Play-off
 – - – - – - – - – - – - – - – - – - – -
 2. Trøgstad/Båstad 22 14 3 5 56–24 45
 3. Kjelsås 2 22 12 6 4 47–20 42
 4. Sarpsborg 22 12 4 6 66–43 40
 5. Rakkestad 22 11 3 8 45–37 36
 6. Fagerborg 22 11 2 9 53–33 35
 7. Greåker 22 8 8 6 32–31 32
 8. Spydeberg 22 7 5 10 39–53 26
 9. Sander 22 7 5 10 32–52 26
 ---------------------------------------
 10.Galterud 22 4 7 11 41–50 19 Relegated
 11.Bygdø 22 5 3 14 30–68 18 Relegated
 12.Nesodden 22 0 3 19 26–84 3 Relegated

Group 6
 1. Elverum 22 17 1 4 95–25 52 Play-off
 – - – - – - – - – - – - – - – - – - – -
 2. Raufoss 2 22 17 1 4 89–29 52
 3. Vardal 22 11 5 6 63–43 38
 4. Ringebu/Fåvang 22 10 3 9 53–59 33
 5. Hamarkameratene 2 22 8 6 8 54–39 30
 6. Trysil 22 9 3 10 45–48 30
 7. Toten 22 8 5 9 48–55 29
 8. Kolbu/KK 22 8 5 9 48–56 29
 9. FF Lillehammer 2 22 7 3 12 43–69 24
 ---------------------------------------
 10.Kvam 22 7 2 13 38–70 23 Relegated
 11.Lom 22 7 2 13 38–72 23 Relegated
 12.Sel/Otta 22 3 4 15 26–75 13 Relegated

Group 7
 1. Grindvoll 22 17 3 2 65–26 54 Play-off
 – - – - – - – - – - – - – - – - – - – -
 2. Mercantile/Lamb. 22 16 3 3 54–15 51 (1
 3. Grei 22 14 5 3 61–23 47
 4. L/F Hønefoss 2 22 13 3 6 58–39 42
 5. Jevnaker 22 10 1 11 50–43 31
 6. Holmen 22 7 5 10 32–48 26 
 7. Vang 22 7 3 12 35–52 24
 8. Sør-Aurdal 22 6 5 11 32–51 23 (2
 9. Lunner 22 6 4 12 42–60 22
 ---------------------------------------
 10.Fart 22 6 4 12 35–58 22 Relegated
 11.Gjøvik/Lyn 2 22 5 3 14 35–58 18 Relegated
 12.Rommen 22 4 3 15 29–55 15 Relegated

(1 Mercantile/Lambertseter changed their name (back) to Mercantile.
(2 Sør-Aurdal merged with Fagernes to form SAFK Fagernes.

Group 8
 1. Strømsgodset 2 22 18 1 3 72–17 55
 – - – - – - – - – - – - – - – - – - – -
 2. Birkebeineren 22 16 2 4 80–24 50 Play-off
 3. Fossum (Bærum) 22 15 3 4 63–24 48
 4. Runar 22 15 3 4 63–27 48
 5. Teie 22 15 1 6 44–38 46
 6. Stokke 22 8 3 11 46–50 27
 7. Åssiden 22 8 3 11 45–52 27
 8. Falk 22 8 1 13 39–64 25
 9. Slemmestad 22 5 1 16 26–64 16
 ---------------------------------------
 10. Halsen-Larvik 22 4 3 15 23–72 15 Relegated
 11.Drafn 22 3 4 15 47–67 13 Relegated
 12.Sandefjord BK 22 2 5 15 32–81 11 Relegated

Group 9
 1. Larvik Fotball 22 18 2 2 95–19 56 Play-off
 – - – - – - – - – - – - – - – - – - – -
 2. Flint 22 16 3 3 92–31 51
 3. Larvik Turn 22 16 3 3 67–25 51
 4. Mjøndalen 22 14 1 7 60–34 43
 5. Åmot 22 13 3 6 50–37 42
 6. Vestfossen 22 11 2 9 60–50 35
 7. Eik-Tønsberg 2 22 11 1 10 40–53 34
 8. Kongsberg 22 10 2 10 40–32 32
 9. Tønsberg FK 22 7 0 15 28–62 21
 ---------------------------------------
 10.Borre 22 4 1 17 32–79 13 Relegated
 11.Konnerud 22 1 2 19 23–77 5 Relegated
 12.Rjukan 22 0 2 20 25–113 2 Relegated

Group 10
 1. Jerv 22 15 2 5 60–23 47 Play-off 
 – - – - – - – - – - – - – - – - – - – - 
 2. Langesund/Stath. 22 14 2 6 49–34 44
 3. Urædd 22 10 6 6 48–36 36
 4. FK Arendal 22 10 6 6 46–38 36
 5. Notodden 22 10 2 10 50–43 32
 6. Skotfoss 22 9 4 9 50–41 31
 7. Skarphedin 22 9 4 9 39–30 31 
 8. Herkules 22 8 3 11 35–53 27
 9. Siljan 22 7 5 10 39–49 26
 ---------------------------------------
 10.Brevik 22 6 5 11 37–51 23 Relegated
 11.Seljord 22 6 5 11 37–54 23 Relegated
 12.Langangen 22 4 4 14 25–63 16 Relegated

Group 11
 1. Vindbjart 22 17 1 4 70–29 52 Play-off
 – - – - – - – - – - – - – - – - – - – -
 2. Lyngdal 22 16 3 3 53–20 51
 3. Start 2 22 15 2 5 75–28 47
 4. Flekkerøy 22 14 1 7 47–33 43
 5. Våg 22 12 3 7 59–33 39
 6. Flekkefjord 22 11 4 7 46–51 37
 7. Vigør 22 9 4 9 48–43 31
 8. Søgne 22 8 3 11 46–50 27
 9. Rygene 22 5 3 14 27–49 18
 ---------------------------------------
 10.Kvinesdal 22 3 5 14 21–65 14 Relegated
 11. Giv Akt 22 3 2 17 23–66 11 Relegated
 12.Randesund 22 3 1 18 29–77 10 Relegated

Group 12
 1. Klepp 22 16 1 5 78–33 49 Play-off
 – - – - – - – - – - – - – - – - – - – -
 2. Bryne 2 22 16 1 5 63–24 49
 3. Eiger 22 13 2 7 53–44 41
 4. Randaberg 22 12 3 7 47–40 39
 5. Vardeneset 22 11 2 9 68–48 35
 6. Vaulen 22 9 3 10 61–61 30
 7. Tasta 22 9 3 10 55–55 30
 8. Ulf-Sandnes 22 8 4 10 43–47 28
 9. Egersund 22 8 4 10 35–41 28
 ---------------------------------------
 10.Staal 22 8 3 11 54–58 27 Relegated
 11.Rosseland 22 7 1 14 44–57 22 Relegated
 12.Nærbø 22 0 3 19 12–105 3 Relegated

Group 13
 1. Vedavåg Karmøy 22 15 4 3 57–27 49 Play-off
 – - – - – - – - – - – - – - – - – - – -
 2. Ålgård 22 13 4 5 53–35 43
 3. Åkra 22 13 2 7 64–42 41
 4. Hundvåg 22 10 5 7 44–35 35
 5. Hana 22 11 2 9 48–43 35
 6. Torvastad 22 10 1 11 42–46 31
 7. Haugesund 2 22 8 5 9 50–44 29
 8. Figgjo 22 8 3 11 46–48 27
 9. Sola 22 7 4 11 34–54 25
 ---------------------------------------
 10.Kopervik 22 6 6 10 30–38 24 Relegated
 11.Skjold 22 6 4 12 31–51 22 Relegated
 12.Ganddal 22 3 4 15 23–59 13 Relegated

Group 14
 1. Radøy 22 17 5 0 87–29 56 Play-off (1
 – - – - – - – - – - – - – - – - – - – -
 2. Hald 22 12 6 4 46–25 42
 3. Ny-Krohnborg 22 12 4 6 65–42 40
 4. Gneist 22 11 3 8 56–40 36
 5. Austevoll 22 9 5 8 59–51 32
 6. Lyngbø 22 10 2 10 38–40 32
 7. Arna-Bjørnar 22 8 3 11 37–50 27
 8. Osterøy 22 8 2 12 26–61 26
 9. Trane 22 7 4 11 49–58 25
 ---------------------------------------
 10.Bergen Nord 22 7 2 13 39–59 23 Relegated
 11.Nordhordland 22 4 5 13 29–49 17 Relegated
 12.Frøya 22 4 5 13 26–53 17 Relegated

(1 Radøy merged with Manger to form Radøy/Manger.

Group 15
 1. Brann 2 22 15 5 2 84–23 50 Play-off
 – - – - – - – - – - – - – - – - – - – -
 2. Askøy 22 15 2 5 81–42 47
 3. Hovding 22 13 6 3 54–27 45
 4. Vadmyra 22 11 3 8 47–44 36
 5. Os 22 11 2 9 45–42 35
 6. Trott 22 9 5 8 43–30 32
 7. Follese 22 8 5 9 37–44 29
 8. Bremnes 22 8 4 10 44–48 28
 9. Varegg 22 6 7 9 43–44 25
 ---------------------------------------
 10.Trio 22 7 4 11 41–44 25 Relegated
 11.Kjøkkelvik 22 5 1 16 23–74 16 Relegated
 12.Bjarg 22 1 2 19 24–104 5 Relegated

Group 16
 1. Stryn 22 16 2 4 82–33 50 Play-off
 – - – - – - – - – - – - – - – - – - – -
 2. Jotun 22 15 3 4 86–21 48
 3. Fjøra 22 14 5 3 76–31 47
 4. Sogndal 2 22 14 3 5 82–40 45
 5. Sandane 22 10 1 11 75–55 31
 6. Høyang 22 9 4 9 61–67 31
 7. Saga 22 9 3 10 32–53 30
 8. Dale (Sunnfjord) 22 8 4 10 38–47 28
 9. Eid 22 7 6 9 37–43 27
 ---------------------------------------
 10.Kaupanger 22 7 1 14 28–78 22 Relegated
 11.Askvoll/Holmedal 22 3 2 17 28–93 11 Relegated
 12.Eikefjord 22 3 0 19 30–94 9 Relegated

Group 17
 1. Langevåg 24 18 3 3 83–33 57 Play-off
 – - – - – - – - – - – - – - – - – - – -
 2. Ørsta 24 17 4 3 80–33 55
 3. Aalesund 2 24 12 4 8 71–43 40
 4. Stranda 24 12 4 8 61–49 40
 5. Velledalen/Ringen 24 9 10 5 51–39 37
 6. Bergsøy 24 11 4 9 53–62 37
 7. Vigra 24 9 5 10 43–44 32
 8. Hareid 24 9 4 11 44–48 31
 9. Volda 24 8 7 9 48–58 31
 ---------------------------------------
 10.Brattvåg 24 8 3 13 38–56 27 Relegated
 11.Haramsøy/Nordøy 24 8 1 15 44–73 25 Relegated
 12.Hovdebygda 24 3 5 16 32–68 14 Relegated
 13.Åram/Vanylvskam. 24 2 6 16 34–76 12 Relegated

Group 18
 1. Dahle 22 15 2 5 70–38 47 Play-off
 – - – - – - – - – - – - – - – - – - – -
 2. Kristiansund 22 14 3 5 74–40 45
 3. Åndalsnes 22 12 3 7 69–44 39
 4. Midsund 22 10 6 6 57–45 36
 5. Sunndal 22 11 3 8 46–40 36
 6. Gossen 22 11 1 10 51–46 34
 7. Surnadal 22 11 1 10 49–48 34
 8. Averøykameratene 22 10 1 11 49–48 31
 9. Ekko/Aureosen 22 9 3 10 42–56 30
 ---------------------------------------
 10.Bryn 22 6 1 15 26–64 19 Relegated
 11.Kvass/Ulvungen 22 5 2 15 36–57 17 Relegated
 12.Vestnes Varfjell 22 4 2 16 33–76 14 Relegated

Group 19
 1. Nidelv 22 16 5 1 67–23 53 Play-off
 – - – - – - – - – - – - – - – - – - – -
 2. Kolstad 22 14 2 6 65–41 44
 3. Løkken 22 13 4 5 69–36 43 (1
 4. Orkla 22 13 4 5 42–27 43
 5. Tynset 22 11 7 4 70–41 40
 6. Buvik 22 10 2 10 60–59 32
 7. Nardo 22 9 3 10 36–43 30
 8. Malvik FK 22 7 5 10 40–46 26
 9. Melhus 22 5 5 12 34–45 20
 ---------------------------------------
 10.NTNUI 22 6 2 14 37–68 20 Relegated
 11.KIL/Hemne 22 3 5 14 36–67 14 Relegated
 12.Røros 22 2 2 18 27–87 8 Relegated

(1 Løkken merged with Dalguten to form Løkken/Dalguten.

Group 20
 1. Levanger 22 15 3 4 67–23 48 Play-off
 – - – - – - – - – - – - – - – - – - – -
 2. Tiller 22 14 3 5 73–40 45
 3. Bangsund 22 12 6 4 45–28 42 
 4. Rørvik 22 12 4 6 56–38 40
 5. Rissa 22 11 6 5 62–31 39
 6. Varden (Meråker) 22 10 4 8 64–51 34 (1
 7. Selbu 22 9 3 10 38–47 30
 8. Vinne/Verdal 2 22 7 2 13 34–57 23
 9. Namsos 22 6 3 13 51–68 21
 ---------------------------------------
 10.Kvik (Trondheim) 22 5 4 13 47–55 19 Relegated
 11.Bogen 22 5 4 13 28–69 19 Relegated
 12.Fosen 22 3 4 15 25–83 13 Relegated

(1: Varden withdrew before the 2002 season.

Group 21
 1. Innstranden 18 13 4 1 88–22 43 Play-off
 – - – - – - – - – - – - – - – - – - – -
 2. Bodø/Glimt 2 18 11 4 3 69–30 37
 3. Steigen 18 11 4 3 60–24 37
 4. Mosjøen 18 10 3 5 38–38 33
 5. Tverlandet 18 9 3 6 48–35 30
 6. Brønnøysund 18 7 5 6 31–40 26
 7. Sandnessjøen 18 6 4 8 17–32 22
 8. Nesna 18 3 1 14 34–70 10
 9. Leirfjord 18 2 2 14 17–51 8 
 ---------------------------------------
 10.Mo 2 18 2 2 14 21–81 8 Relegated
 Gevir Bodø withdrew.

Group 22
 1. Vesterålen 20 19 0 1 99–25 57 Play-off
 – - – - – - – - – - – - – - – - – - – -
 2. Skånland/Omegn 20 13 5 2 54–29 44
 3. Grovfjord 20 12 1 7 43–30 37
 4. Flakstad 20 10 3 7 49–33 33
 5. Medkila 20 9 2 9 57–51 29
 6. Morild 20 7 7 6 32–42 28
 7. Ballangen 20 8 1 11 38–58 25
 8. Beisfjord 20 6 3 11 38–58 21
 9. Høken 20 3 7 10 43–55 16
 ---------------------------------------
 10.Melbo 20 5 1 14 44–75 16 Relegated
 11. Harstad 2 20 2 2 16 33–74 8 Relegated
 Lofoten 2 withdrew.

Group 23
 1. Salangen 22 17 1 4 84–44 52 Play-off
 – - – - – - – - – - – - – - – - – - – -
 2. Tromsø 2 22 13 3 6 87–48 42
 3. Lyngen/Karnes 22 13 3 6 80–41 42
 4. Senja 22 12 4 6 86–54 40
 5. Fløya 22 11 3 8 60–55 36
 6. Ramfjord 22 10 3 9 61–48 33
 7. Ringvassøy 22 10 1 11 58–51 31
 8. Tromsdalen 2 22 9 2 11 67–69 29
 9. Kvaløysletta 22 7 3 12 46–66 24
 ---------------------------------------
 10.Nordreisa 22 7 2 13 28–62 23 Relegated
 11.Ishavsbyen 22 6 4 12 41–63 22 Relegated
 12.Finnsnes 2 22 2 1 19 31–128 7 (ex Pioner) Relegated

Group 24
 1. Porsanger 20 16 3 1 73–19 51 Play-off
 – - – - – - – - – - – - – - – - – - – -
 2. Kautokeino 20 16 2 2 77–28 50
 3. Bossekop 20 13 2 5 67–24 41
 4. Nordlys 20 10 2 8 65–39 32
 5. Polarstjernen 20 8 4 8 37–53 28
 6. Tverrelvdalen 20 8 1 11 36–68 25
 7. Kirkenes 20 6 4 10 39–43 22
 8. Honningsvåg 20 6 2 12 25–60 20
 9. Nerskogen 20 5 3 12 34–59 18
 ---------------------------------------
 10.Nordkinn 20 5 2 13 26–53 17 Relegated
 11.Sørøy/Glimt 20 3 3 14 32–65 12 Relegated

Play-off

First round
 September 29: Lillestrøm 2 – Follo 1–0
 Larvik Fotball – Vindbjart 3–1
 Salangen – Porsanger 2–1
 September 30: Grindvoll – Nittedal 2–0
 Stryn – Elverum 4–3
 Vedavåg Karmøy – Klepp 1–2
 Brann 2 – Radøy 1–1
 Dahle – Langevåg 5–2
 Nidelv – Levanger 2–0
 Vesterålen – Innstranden 1–2
 October 16: Moss 2 – Frigg Oslo 1–1
 November 3: Birkebeineren – Jerv 2–1

Second round
 October 6: Follo – Lillestrøm 2 2–0 (agg. 2–1)
 Nittedal – Grindvoll 2–3 (agg. 2–5)
 Elverum – Stryn 4–0 (agg. 7–4)
 Vindbjart – Larvik Fotball 1–0 (agg. 2–3)
 Porsanger – Salangen 1–3 (agg. 2–5)
 October 7: Klepp – Vedavåg Karmøy 4–2 (agg. 6–3)
 Langevåg – Dahle 3–0 (agg. 5–5, Langevåg on away goals)
 Levanger – Nidelv 3–0 (agg. 3–2)
 Innstranden – Vesterålen 2–5 (agg. 4–6)
 October 14: Radøy – Brann 2 2–2 (agg. 3–3, Brann 2 on away goals)
 October 19: Frigg Oslo – Moss 2 1–0 (agg. 2–1)
 November 10: Jerv – Birkebeineren 3–0 (agg. 4–2)

Promoted to Second Division 2002
Brann 2, Elverum, Follo, Frigg Oslo, Grindvoll, Jerv, Klepp, Langevåg, Larvik, Levanger, Salangen and Vesterålen

Norwegian Cup

Final

UEFA competitions

Norwegian representatives
Rosenborg (UEFA Champions League)
Brann (UEFA Champions League)
Odd Grenland (UEFA Cup, cup winner)
Viking (UEFA Cup)

Champions League

Qualifying rounds

Second qualifying round

|}

Third qualifying round

|}

Champions League, Phase 1

Group E

Matches
September 18: Rosenborg – Porto (Portugal) 1–2
September 25: Rosenborg – Juventus (Italy) 1–1
October 10: Celtic (Scotland) – Rosenborg 1–0
October 17: Juventus – Rosenborg 1–0
October 23: Rosenborg – Celtic 2–0
October 31: Porto – Rosenborg 1–0

UEFA Cup

Preliminary round
 August 9: Viking – Brotnjo (Bosnia) 1–0
 Stavanger stadion
 Att: 2900
 1–0 (83) Erik Fuglestad (penalty)
 Referee: John Underhill, Scotland.
 Red card: Sablic Nino, Brotnjo (90).
 Yellow card: Dragan Blathjak, Sablic Nino, Miljenko Sedelj, Brotnjo.

 August 23: Brotnjo – Viking 1–1 (agg. 1–2)
 Citluk
 Att: 5000
 0–1 (26) Hannu Tihinen 
 1–1 (31) Danijel Krivic 
 Referee: Rene Rogala, Switzerland.
 Red card: Denis Milos (76), Brotnjo.
 Yellow card: Jancevski, Raguz, Jerkovic, Brotnjo.

First round
 September 20: Kilmarnock (Scotland) – Viking 1–1
 Rugby Park
 Att: 6322
 0–1 (45) Tom Sanne 
 1–1 (73) Craig Dargo 
 Referee: Ivan Dobrinov, Bulgaria.
 Yellow card: Hannu Tihinen, Viking.

 September 20: Odd Grenland – Helsingborg (Sweden) 2–2
 Odd Stadion
 Att: 3012
 1–0 (9) Morten Fevang
 1–1 (23) Mikael Hansson 
 2–1 (32) Edwin van Ankeren 
 2–2 (56) Alvaro Santos 
 Referee: Sten Kaldma, Estonia.
 Yellow card: Morten Fevang, Odd Grenland, Bjørn Johansen, Jesper Jansson, 
 Helsingborg.

 September 27: Helsingborg – Odd Grenland 1–1 (agg. 3–3, Helsingborg on away goals)
 Olympia
 Att: 4034
 1–0 (3) Alvaro Santos
 1–1 (43) Morten Fevang 
 Referee: Sergiy Shebek, Ukraine.

 September 27: Viking – Kilmarnock 2–0 (agg. 3–1)
 Stavanger stadion
 Att: 4335
 1–0 (1) Tom Sanne 
 2–0 (18) Erik Nevland 
 Referee: Eric Romain, Belgium.
 Yellow card: Ally Mitchell, Kilmarnock.

Second round
 October 16: Viking – Hertha BSC Berlin (Germany) 0–1
 Stavanger stadion
 Att: 3750
 0–1 (5) Michael Preetz 
 Referee: Miroslav Liba, Czech Republic.
 Yellow card: Morten Berre, Hannu Tihinen, Viking, Rob Maas, Bart Goor, Hertha Berlin.

 November 1: Hertha BSC Berlin – Viking 2–0 (agg. 3–0)
 Olympiastadion
 Att: 19.864
 1–0 (17) Alex Alves 
 2–0 (28) Eijölfur Sverrisson 
 Referee: Paul Allaerts, Belgium

Women's football

League season

Toppserien

1. divisjon
 1. Sandviken 16 11 2 3 54- 22 35 Promoted
 2. FK Larvik 16 11 2 3 63- 35 32 Promoted
 -------------------------------------
 3. Follese 16 7 3 6 21- 27 24
 4. Fløya 16 6 4 6 28- 31 22
 5. Haugar 16 6 3 7 26- 33 21
 6. Fortuna 16 6 2 8 34- 33 20
 7. Vålerenga 16 4 5 7 30- 27 17
 8. Medkila 16 4 5 7 31- 32 17
 -------------------------------------
 9. Verdal 16 3 2 11 17- 64 11 Relegated
 Grand Bodø withdrew before the season because of financial problems.

2. divisjon

Group 1
 1. Skeid 22 22 0 0 145- 11 66 Play-off
 2. Kolbotn 2 22 16 2 4 103- 33 50
 – - – - – - – - – - – - – - – - – - – -
 3. Gjelleråsen 22 13 2 7 64- 55 41 Play-off
 4. Bækkelaget 22 11 4 7 75- 40 37
 5. Storhamar 22 12 1 9 60- 49 37
 6. Asker 2 22 11 2 9 77- 72 35
 7. Vallset 22 9 2 11 43- 61 29
 8. Team Strømmen 2 22 9 1 12 51- 70 28
 9. Skjetten 22 9 0 13 59- 86 27
 10. Gjøvik FK 22 4 3 15 36- 78 15
 ---------------------------------------
 11.Kvik Halden 22 3 2 17 30- 91 11 Relegated
 12.Kurland 22 3 1 18 16–113 10 Relegated

Group 2
 1. Fossum (Skien) 16 13 0 3 57–22 39 Play-off
 – - – - – - – - – - – - – - – - – - – -
 2. Donn 16 12 1 3 53–15 37
 3. Amazon Grimstad 16 11 3 2 56–17 36
 4. Søgne 16 5 3 8 28–35 18
 5. Runar 16 5 3 8 20–40 18
 6. Notodden 16 4 4 8 20–40 16 
 7. Bingen 16 4 3 9 25–61 15
 8. Eik-Tønsberg 16 3 3 10 24–36 12
 ---------------------------------------
 9. Horten FK 16 2 6 8 27–44 12 Relegated

Group 3
 1. Bryne 7 6 1 0 27- 6 19 Play-off Vestland
 2. Hinna 7 4 3 0 15- 3 15 Play-off Vestland
 3. Havørn 7 5 0 2 16–12 15 Play-off Vestland
 4. Randaberg 7 4 1 2 19–18 13 Play-off Vestland
 – - – - – - – - – - – - – - – - – - – -
 5. Flekkefjord 7 2 1 4 14–14 7 
 6. Austrått 7 2 0 5 14–11 6
 7. Vard Haugesund 7 1 0 6 6–25 3
 8. Eiger 7 1 0 6 6–28 3

Group 4
 1. Øygard 9 8 1 0 32- 4 25 Play-off Vestland
 2. Sandane 9 6 1 2 39- 8 19 Play-off Vestland
 3. Kaupanger 9 6 1 2 31–12 19 Play-off Vestland
 4. Nymark 9 5 2 2 30–19 17 Play-off Vestland
 5. Arna-Bjørnar 2 9 5 2 2 23–14 17 Play-off Vestland
 – - – - – - – - – - – - – - – - – - – -
 6. Fyllingen 9 3 2 4 14–26 11
 7. Voss 9 3 0 6 17–13 9
 8. Bremnes 9 2 1 6 12–29 7
 9. Åsane 9 0 3 6 8–36 3
 10.Djerv 9 0 1 8 4–49 1

Group 5
 1. Herd 15 11 3 1 66–20 36 Play-off Møre/Trøndelag
 – - – - – - – - – - – - – - – - – - – -
 2. Molde 15 9 2 4 50–33 29
 3. Stranda 15 7 4 4 33–25 25
 4. Træff 15 5 3 7 22–29 18
 5. Velledalen/Ringen 15 2 4 9 16–43 10
 6. Haramsøy/Nordøy 15 2 2 11 16–53 8

Group 6
 1. Trondheims/Ørn 2 16 14 1 1 62–12 43
 – - – - – - – - – - – - – - – - – - – -
 2. Orkla 16 13 0 3 72–32 39 Play-off Møre/Trøndelag
 3. Kattem/Leinstrand 16 12 1 3 72–32 37
 4. Ranheim 16 7 1 8 73–57 22
 5. Rindals/Troll 16 5 2 9 34–44 17
 6. Singsås 16 5 1 10 34–63 16
 7. Byåsen 2 16 4 3 9 35–41 15
 8. Tolga/Tynset 16 3 2 11 26–72 11
 ---------------------------------------
 9. Stadsbygd 16 3 1 12 21–76 10 Relegated

Group 7
 1. Innstranden 12 12 0 0 77- 5 36 Play-off Nord-Norge
 – - – - – - – - – - – - – - – - – - – -
 2. Fauske/Sprint 12 6 4 2 42–22 22
 3. Grand Bodø 2 12 6 3 3 37–25 21
 4. Olderskog 12 5 0 7 24–36 15
 5. Sandsnessjøen 12 3 3 6 26–27 12
 6. Bossmo/Ytteren 12 2 4 6 14–37 10
 ---------------------------------------
 7. Drevvatn 12 0 2 10 10–78 2 Relegated

Group 8
 1. Håkvik 12 9 2 1 60–21 29 Play-off Nord-Norge
 – - – - – - – - – - – - – - – - – - – -
 2. Leknes 12 8 1 3 72–27 25 
 3. Stålbrott 12 8 0 4 50–36 24
 4. Narvik FK 12 6 0 6 29–30 18
 5. Morild 12 4 1 7 27–41 13
 6. Kvæfjord 12 3 0 9 11–44 9 
 ---------------------------------------
 7. Medkila 2/Brage/Trondenes 2 12 2 0 10 16–66 6 Relegated

Group 9
 1. Alta 14 13 0 1 69–12 39 Play-off Nord-Norge
 – - – - – - – - – - – - – - – - – - – -
 2. Tromsdalen 14 12 1 1 77–11 37
 3. Pioner 14 9 0 5 58–22 27
 4. Fløya 2 14 7 3 4 61–32 24
 5. Salangen 14 6 2 6 39–47 20
 6. Kvaløysletta 14 4 0 10 24–63 12
 ---------------------------------------
 7. HIF/Stein 14 2 0 12 25–52 6 Relegated
 8. Sørreisa 14 0 0 14 7–121 0 Relegated

Play-off Vestland
 1. Nymark 8 6 1 1 32- 8 19 Play-off
 – - – - – - – - – - – - – - – - – - – -
 2. Bryne 8 5 1 2 23–13 16
 3. Sandane 8 4 2 2 22–11 14
 4. Kaupanger 8 4 2 2 21–15 14
 5. Øygard 8 4 1 3 23–14 13
 6. Hinna 8 3 2 3 19–13 11
 7. Arna-Bjørnar 2 8 3 1 4 12–23 10
 8. Havørn 8 1 1 6 10–20 4
 9. Randaberg 8 0 1 7 9–54 1

Play-out Group 3
 1. Flekkefjord 6 4 0 2 19–10 12
 2. Vard Haugesund 6 4 0 2 13- 8 12
 ---------------------------------------
 3. Austrått 6 2 1 3 11–14 7
 4. Eiger 6 1 1 4 8–19 4

Play-out Group 4
 1. Voss 8 6 1 1 25–10 19
 2. Bremnes 8 5 2 1 23–13 17 
 3. Fyllingen 8 3 3 2 18–17 12
 ---------------------------------------
 4. Djerv 8 1 3 4 7–13 6
 5. Åsane 8 0 1 7 4–24 1

Play-off Møre/Trøndelag
 September 23: Herd – Orkla 1–0

Herd to play-off. (Match in Sunndal)

Play-off Nord-Norge
 September 21: Innstranden – Håkvik 1–0
 September 22: Innstranden – Alta 5–0
 September 23: Håkvik – Alta

(Tournament in Narvik)

 1. Innstranden 2 2 0 0 6- 0 6 Play-off
 – - – - – - – - – - – - – - – - – - – -
 2. Håkvik 1 0 0 1 0- 1 0
 3. Alta 1 0 0 2 0- 5 0

Play-off Group A
 September 29: Skeid – Herd 5–0
 October 7: Innstranden – Skeid 0–0
 October 14: Herd – Innstranden 0–4

 1. Skeid 2 1 1 0 5- 0 4 Promoted
 ---------------------------------------
 2. Innstranden 2 1 1 0 4- 0 4
 3. Herd 2 0 0 2 0- 9 0

Play-off Group B
 1. Gjelleråsen 2 2 0 0 6- 1 6 Promoted
 ---------------------------------------
 2. Nymark 2 1 0 1 2- 5 3
 3. Fossum (Skien) 2 0 0 2 2- 4 0

Women's European Cup

Norwegian representatives
Trondheims/Ørn (UEFA Cup)

UEFA Cup

Group 1
In Trondheim
 September 20: Trondheims/Ørn – KR Reykjavik (Iceland) 9–0
 September 22: Trondheims/Ørn – Babruyshanka (Bulgaria) 6–1
 September 24: Eendracht Aalst (Belgium) – Trondheims/Ørn 0–8

 1.Trondheims-Ørn 3 3 0 0 23- 1 9
 2.FC Babruyshanka 3 2 0 1 8- 8 6
 3.KSC Eendracht Aalst 3 1 0 2 5–15 3
 4.KR (Reykjavík) 3 0 0 3 4–16 0

Quarter-finals
 March 16: Trondheims/Ørn – HJK Helsinki (Finland) 2–1
 March 28: HJK Helsinki – Trondheims/Ørn 2–0 (agg. 3–2)

National teams

Norway men's national football team

Note: Norway's goals first 
Explanation:
F = Friendly
WCQ = FIFA World Cup 2002 Qualifier

Norway women's national football team

 January 12: Norway – Sweden 2–1, friendly 
 February 17: France – Norway 0–0, friendly 
 March 11: Norway – Finland 5–1, friendly 
 March 13: Norway – China 0–2, friendly 
 March 15: Norway – Denmark 1–0, friendly 
 March 17: Norway – United States 4–3, friendly 
 May 13: Norway – Sweden 3–1, friendly 
 June 19: Norway – Canada 9–1, friendly 
 June 25: Norway – France 3–0, European Championship 
 1.round 
 June 28: Norway – Italy 1–1, European Championship
 1.round 
 July 1: Denmark – Norway 1–0, European Championship 
 1.round 
 July 4: Germany – Norway 1–0, European Championship semifinal 
 September 8: Norway – Ukraine 4–0, World Cup qualifier 
 September 11: Norway – Czech Republic 5–0, World Cup qualifier 
 October 13: France – Norway 0–3, World Cup qualifier

 
Seasons in Norwegian football